Krasnoryazhsky is a rural locality (a settlement) in Podborny Selsoviet, Krutikhinsky District, Altai Krai, Russia. The population was 71 as of 2013. There is 1 street.

Geography 
Krasnoryazhsky is located 24 km southwest of Krutikha (the district's administrative centre) by road. Podborny is the nearest rural locality.

References 

Rural localities in Krutikhinsky District